Swerve is an album by Tucson, Arizona-based rock band Giant Sand. It was first released in 1990 on the Amazing Black Sand label, and was re-released in 1993 by both Amazing Black Sand and Restless Records. It features performances by guest artists such as Chris Cacavas of Green on Red, Juliana Hatfield, and Steve Wynn. Its music has been described as "Sticky Fingers country-rock".

Track listing
 Can't Find Love
 Swerver
 Sisters + Brothers
 Swerving
 Some Kind Of
 Trickle Down System
 Dream Stay
 Former Version Of Ourselves
 Angels At Night
 Every Grain Of Sand
 Swervette
 Final Swerve

References

Giant Sand albums
1990 albums
Restless Records albums
Fire Records (UK) albums